Gary Christopher Martin (born 30 May 1966) is former Zimbabwean One Day International cricket bowler who played in five ODIs between 1994 and 1995.

External links
 

1966 births
Living people
Sportspeople from Marondera
White Zimbabwean sportspeople
Zimbabwe One Day International cricketers
Zimbabwean cricketers
Mashonaland cricketers